Hypericum sinaicum is a perennial herb in the genus Hypericum, in the section Adenosepalum.

Description
The species grows to be 0.1-0.35 meters tall. Its stems are generally green but often have a reddish hue. Its petals are a pale yellow and can have faint red veins. Its seeds are a dark reddish brown. H. sinaicum is very similar in appearance to Hypericum collenetteae.

Distribution
Hypericum sincaicum is found in the Sinai Peninsula, Northern Saudi Arabia, and parts of Jordan.

References

sinaicum
Flora of Jordan
Flora of Egypt
Flora of Palestine (region)
Flora of Saudi Arabia
Sinai Peninsula
Taxa named by Pierre Edmond Boissier
Taxa named by Christian Ferdinand Friedrich Hochstetter